Two Circle Sentinel is an outdoor 1961 stainless steel sculpture by David Smith, installed at the Museum of Fine Arts, Houston's Lillie and Hugh Roy Cullen Sculpture Garden in the U.S. state of Texas. It was purchased using monetary contributions provided by the Brown Foundation Accessions Endowment Fund in memory of Alice Pratt Brown.

See also
 1961 in art
 List of public art in Houston

References

1961 establishments in Texas
1961 sculptures
Lillie and Hugh Roy Cullen Sculpture Garden
Steel sculptures in Texas
Stainless steel sculptures in the United States